Octyl glucoside (n-octyl-β--glucoside) is a nonionic surfactant frequently used to solubilise integral membrane proteins for studies in biochemistry. Structurally, it is a glycoside derived from glucose and octanol. Like Genapol X-100 and Triton X-100, it is a nonphysiological amphiphile that makes lipid bilayers less "stiff".

Applications
Octyl glucoside has become one of the most important detergents for purification of membrane proteins because it generally does not denature the protein and can readily be removed from final protein extracts.  Above its critical micelle concentration of 0.025 M (~0.7% w/v), it was noted as the best detergent for improving selectivity of immunoprecipitation of phosphotyrosine modified proteins.  This detergent has also been shown to rapidly inactivate infective HIV at concentrations above its CMC.

The compound gained popularity with researchers following the publication of an improved synthesis in 1978.  However, in 1990 the cost remained prohibitive for large-scale protein isolation.

Octyl glucoside has been proposed as a conditioning agent to prevent microbial colonization of contact lenses, due to its ability to lower the hydrophobicity of contact lenses and prevent adhesion of Staphylococcus epidermidis and Pseudomonas aeruginosa.

See also
 Decyl glucoside
 Lauryl glucoside
 Alkyl polyglycoside
 octyl thioglucoside

External links
 octyl glucoside bound to proteins in the PDB

References 

Glucosides
Non-ionic surfactants